Marko Kešelj (born January 2, 1988) is a Serbian politician and retired professional basketball player serving as the state secretary in the Ministry of Sports since 4 November 2022. He previously served as a member of the National Assembly from 1 August 2022 until his resignation on 10 November 2022.

He is also a presidency member of Crvena zvezda. He represented the Serbian national team in the international competitions. He is a 2.08 m (6'10") tall small forward.

Professional career
Kešelj started his career in his hometown with a club called Mega Ishrana. Despite his young age, Kešelj already has the experience of playing for two top-quality foreign clubs, the Spanish ACB League club Akasvayu Girona and the German League club Köln 99ers. During the summer of 2006, his talents were spotted by Serbian coach Svetislav Pešić, who brought him to Girona in the Spanish ACB League at the age of 18.

However, Kešelj could not establish himself in the squad and got very little playing time. In the summer of 2007, he transferred to the German League to the Köln 99ers, which were led by another Serbian coach, Saša Obradović. Following a so-so season, Obradović left to coach Kiev, and Kešelj also started looking for a transfer.

Upon rumors that Pešić, his mentor from his Girona days, might be taking over Crvena zvezda, Keselj decided to sign with the club during the summer of 2008, even before Pešić's arrival had become official. In 2010, he signed a 3-year contract with the Greek League club Olympiacos. With Olympiacos, he won the EuroLeague and Greek League championships in 2012.

On August 14, 2012, Kešelj signed one-year contract with Valencia. On February 5, 2013, he left Valencia and signed with Le Mans Sarthe Basket for the rest of the season. On August 8, 2013, he signed a one-year contract with ASVEL Basket.

On October 14, 2014, he signed an open contract with the Serbian team Mega Vizura. On June 17, 2015, it was confirmed that Kešelj will play with the Portland Trail Blazers at the 2015 NBA Summer League.

On January 6, 2016, Kešelj signed with the Greek club Lavrio for the rest of the 2015–16 Greek Basket League season. On September 18, 2016, Kešelj signed with Belgian club Telenet Oostende.

On July 28, 2017, Kešelj returned to Crvena zvezda, signing a two-year deal. On January 4, 2019, he scored 20 points for the night and his 1,000th point for the Zvezda.

National team career
Kešelj was a member of the Serbian junior national teams, and he played at the 2007 FIBA Under-19 World Championship in Novi Sad and at the 2008 FIBA Europe Under-20 Championship. Kešelj was also a member of the senior Serbian national team at the 2010 FIBA World Championship, where Serbia was defeated by Lithuania, in the game for the bronze medal. He was also capped for the national team of Serbia at the EuroBasket 2011, in Lithuania, where Serbia finished in 8th place.

Career statistics

EuroLeague

|-
| style="text-align:left;"| 2010–11
| style="text-align:left;"| Olympiacos
| 12 || 3 || 12.3 || .476 || .435 || .500 || 1.0 || .2 || .3 || .3 || 3.8 || 2.1
|-
| style="text-align:left;background:#AFE6BA;"| 2011–12†
| style="text-align:left;"| Olympiacos
| 14 || 8 || 15.7 || .396 || .270 || .600 || 2.0 || .3 || .4 || .0 || 3.9 || 2.4
|- class="sortbottom"
| colspan=2 style="text-align:center;"| Career
| 26 || 11 || 14.1 || .425 || .333 || .538 || 1.5 || .2 || .4 || .1 || 3.9 ||2.3

Post-playing career 
In August 2020, Kešelj was appointed as a presidency member of Crvena zvezda in charge of the sport issues. He was re-elected for 5-year term on 27 December 2021.

Political career 
Kešelj appeared on the Serbian Progressive Party (SNS)-led Together We Can Do Everything ballot list for the 2022 general election, as an independent candidate. Following the election, Kešelj was elected to the National Assembly as MP. Kešelj was appointed state secretary in the Ministry of Sports on 4 November 2022. On 10 November, he resigned as MP.

Personal life 
Kešelj owns and operates a blueberry orchard.

See also 
 List of Serbian NBA Summer League players
 List of Serbia men's national basketball team players

References

External links

 Marko Kešelj at aba-liga.com
 Marko Kešelj at euroleague.net
 Marko Kešelj at fiba.com
 Marko Kešelj at nba.com
 

1988 births
Living people
ABA League players
ASVEL Basket players
Basketball League of Serbia players
BC Oostende players
CB Girona players
Greek Basket League players
KK Avala Ada players
KK Crvena zvezda players
KK Crvena Zvezda executives
KK Mega Basket players
Köln 99ers players
Lavrio B.C. players
Le Mans Sarthe Basket players
Liga ACB players
Olympiacos B.C. players
Serbian basketball executives and administrators
Serbia men's national basketball team players
Serbian expatriate basketball people in Belgium
Serbian expatriate basketball people in France
Serbian expatriate basketball people in Germany
Serbian expatriate basketball people in Greece
Serbian expatriate basketball people in Spain
Serbian men's basketball players
Small forwards
Valencia Basket players
Universiade medalists in basketball
2010 FIBA World Championship players
Universiade gold medalists for Serbia
Medalists at the 2009 Summer Universiade
Members of the National Assembly (Serbia)